Tuolumne is a small unincorporated town in Stanislaus County, California, United States. Near the town is the historic site of, (now defunct), Tuolumne City.

Unincorporated communities in California
Unincorporated communities in Stanislaus County, California